Happy Birthday to Me is the third album by the pop punk band The Muffs. It was released in 1997 on Reprise Records.

Happy Birthday to Me was vocalist/guitarist Kim Shattuck's favorite Muffs album.

Critical reception
The Washington Post wrote that "the band's most convincing songs are designed for those with short attention spans and bad attitudes: Shattuck's guitar snarls, she gripes and then they're over." The Los Angeles Times called the songs "concise, crisply played and melodic." Salon wrote that the album "takes the listener on a blissful, blistering 45-minute joyride."

Track listing
All songs written by Kim Shattuck.

"Crush Me" - 1.48
"That Awful Man" - 1.59
"Honeymoon" - 1.55
"All Blue Baby" - 2.50
"My Crazy Afternoon" - 2.35
"Is It All Okay?" - 3.01
"Pennywhore" - 1.21
"Outer Space" - 3.12
"I'm a Dick" - 1.53
"Nothing" - 1.28
"Where Only I Could Go" - 2.09
"Upside Down" - 2.42
"You and Your Parrot" - 2.17
"Keep Holding Me" - 3.09
"The Best Time Around" - 3.18

Personnel
 Kim Shattuck – Guitar, Vocals
 Ronnie Barnett – Bass
 Roy McDonald – Drums
 Sally Browder and Steve Holroyd – Engineer
 The Muffs – Producer

References

The Muffs albums
1997 albums
Reprise Records albums